Lakshminya (Nepali: लक्ष्मीनिया ) is a rural municipality in Danusha District in Province  No. 2 of Nepal. It was formed in 2016 occupying current 7 sections (wards) from previous 7 VDCs. It occupies an area of 30.66 sq. km with a total population of 28,251.

References 

Populated places in Dhanusha District
Rural municipalities of Nepal established in 2017
Rural municipalities in Madhesh Province